Georgettan's Pooram (Georgettan's Festival) is a 2017 Indian Malayalam action comedy film directed by K. Biju, starring Dileep in lead role, with Rajisha Vijayan, Vinay Forrt, Sharafudheen, Chemban Vinod Jose and Renji Panicker in lead roles. The screenplay is written by Y. V. Rajesh based on a story by Biju. It is produced by Arun Gosh and Bijoy Chandran under the banner of Shivani Entertainments and Chand V Creations.

Plot
  
P. V. Mathai was a participant in the 1990 Asian Games in Beijing. After India beat Bangladesh, P.V Mathai rose to prominence as one of the first Malayalis, from the district of Thrissur to win a gold medal at the Asian Games. When the Games ended, Mathai was welcomed back wholeheartedly by the rest of the people in his area. He gifted the youth of the place a ground and a sports club, which the people named Mathaiparambu. However, the happiness was short-lived, after Mathai was killed in a road accident. The people built a statue in his honour in Mathaiparambu, but soon afterwards, the people forgot the ground's initial use as a sports ground, and the place became a place for the youth to loiter around and play football.

Vava, Thankan and Pallan are three boys who loiter around on Mathaiparambu. Their parents are annoyed and Vava's father (Sunil Sukhada) tells Fr. Mathews Vadakkan (Renji Panicker), a local Mar Thoma priest to set them on the right path and he grants his son George this responsibility. After class one day, the three boys find George peeping through the bathroom, and catch him doing this. After this incident, they say that George is their leader and is one of them.

Years later, George (Dileep), Vava (Vinay Forrt), Pallan (Sharaf U Dheen) and Thankan (Thiru Aftab) are still loitering around the ground doing nothing. They have a small gathering on top of a small tower in Mathaiparambu, where Joseph "Josephettan" (T.G Ravi), a local beggar who takes only Rs. 10 from the poor box near Jesus' statue and from Georgettan, welcomes them like his own children. Fr. Vadakkan is disappointed in his son George and wants him to become a bishop. George tries to impress his father by doing various things in the community, but each activity ends in disaster.

Later, two people come and ask for the gang's permission of starting a driving school in Mathaiparambu. Although at first reluctant, they agree immediately when the two explain that it is a ladies' driving school. However, they are disappointed when they see old women in the school. Then they hear the sad news of the death of a local MLA and a funeral is held by his son Simon (Sudheer Karamana). There, George meets Merlin (Rajisha Vijayan), a singer, and instantly falls in love. He is disappointed at the fact that he doesn't know anything about her, not even her name (he didn't find this out). Him and his friends decide to go to their house the next day to find out anything about her, but this ends in disaster.

The next day, Vava explains that he has a proposal. George and his friends decide to go with him, but he drops off his brother Jose (Jeevan Gopal) at the local convent school, as their father now wants Jose to become a bishop, much to George's delight. There George plays a game of carroms against Kichu (Ganapathi), places a bet of Rs. 2000 but loses the bet. After, he goes with Vava to the marriage proposal and George takes Rs. 2000 from the girl's dad and gives it to Kichu, angering the dad. He cancels the proposal between the two.

George goes and decides to stop the driving school at Mathaiparambu, as he is disappointed at the fact that there are only old women coming. Right afterwards Merlin comes, and George decides to let the driving school carry on. The driving school teacher tells George that she is going to become a nun which her mother insisted, as she said that she doesn't have the three qualities a girl needs to have: desire, wish and love. George finds her desiring for and eating a nellikka, and tells her that he has proven she has one of the three qualities. George, after joining a class at the convent school, is saved by Merlin after a priest asks him questions. George understands this and tells her that he has proven the second of the three qualities, as she saved him in front of the priest.

As they leave the convent school, the gang meet a bunch of youths smoking weed outside. George gets angry over this and starts a fight. As George beats up the last person, his father Fr. Vadakkan slaps him, as Fr. Vadakkan is disappointed even more in him. He goes to Mathaiparambu, but unexpectedly, his mother Mercykutty (Kalaranjini) comes to visit him. She suggests to George that he should never enter the house.

The next day, the locals gather to find some construction on Mathaiparambu. George and his gang go and find Peter Mathai (Chemban Vinod Jose), who explains that he is the son of P.V Mathai and that Mathaiparambu is his. They go to Fr. Vadakkan's church and fight the case out there with the priest, where Peter seems to be favored. In retaliation, George and his gang decide to set up a stray dog conservation scheme on Mathaiparambu, which ends in disaster, ruining George's name in the land. Peter then meets George and attempts to gain George's trust by saying that he is ready to give Mathaiparambu away and leave it to waste. George is saddened and says that he is ready to accept any of Peter's demands. Peter suggests that they start a kabaddi team, which George accepts. They train and play against a team and won.  Then they find Josephettan dead in ground. And a group of Christians are telling that Josephettan is not Christian so he can't be buried in the church. This make George angry and he decide to bury Josephettan in the ground (Mathaayiparambu).

Cast
 Dileep as George Vadakkan
Rajisha Vijayan as Merlin, George's love Interest
 Vinay Forrt as Vava
 Sharaf U Dheen as Pallan
 Chemban Vinod Jose as Peter V. Mathai
 Renji Panicker as Fr. Mathews Vadakkan, George's father
 Jeevan Gopal as Jose Vadakkan
 Thiru Actlab as Thankan
 T.G. Ravi as Joseph "Josephettan"
 Ganapathi S. Poduval as Kitchu
 Sudheer Karamana as Simon
 Pauly Valsan as Vava's mother-in-law
 Assim Jamal as M. Anil
 Sunil Sukhada
 Sathi Premji as Merlin's Grandmother
 Harikrishnan as Ramesh
 Hareesh Kanaran as Tea Shop Owner

Box office
The film collected $114,287 from UAE box office in its two weekends and $6,797 from UK box office.

References

External links
 

2017 films
2010s Malayalam-language films
2010s sports comedy films
Indian sports comedy films
Films shot in Thrissur